Nadine Beckel (born 27 May 1977 in Schwerin) is a shot putter from Germany.

She won the silver medal at the 1996 World Junior Championships, finished ninth at the 2002 European Championships and eighth at the 2005 European Indoor Championships. She also competed at the 2003 World Championships and the 2004 Olympic Games without reaching the finals.

Her personal best throw is 18.59 metres, achieved in June 2003 in Mannheim. She has competed for the athletics clubs Schweriner SC and ASC Düsseldorf.

Achievements

References 
 
 sports-reference

1977 births
Living people
Sportspeople from Schwerin
People from Bezirk Schwerin
German female shot putters
Sportspeople from Mecklenburg-Western Pomerania
Olympic athletes of Germany
Athletes (track and field) at the 2004 Summer Olympics
20th-century German women